Alexander McConnell (born 9 February 1915, date of death unknown) was a unionist politician in Northern Ireland. He was born in Ballyclare. McConnell worked as a publican and joined the Ulster Unionist Party.  He was elected to the Senate of Northern Ireland in 1956, serving until 1961.

In June 1972, it was noted that McConnell was deceased.

References

1915 births
Year of death missing
Members of the Senate of Northern Ireland 1953–1957
Members of the Senate of Northern Ireland 1957–1961
Ulster Unionist Party members of the Senate of Northern Ireland